Vidyanand Sarek is a Pahari litterateur and folk artist. In 2022, he was awarded Padma Shri by the Indian Government for his contribution in literature and folk.

Early life
Sarek is born on June 26, 1941. He is from Rajgarh in Sirmaur district.

Career
Sarek started his career  in 1957 when he was in Class VIII and participated in a folk dance competition organised by All India Radio in Delhi.He has translated 51 poems of Rabindranath Tagore as part of a Central government project. He has also translated  has translated  18 chapters of the Gita into Sirmauri language.

Awards
President's Award in 2018
Padmashree in 2022

References

1941 births
Living people
Recipients of the Padma Shri in literature & education